Emilio López (9 November 1892 – 19 April 1958) was a Spanish equestrian. He competed in two events at the 1924 Summer Olympics.

References

External links
 

1892 births
1958 deaths
Spanish male equestrians
Olympic equestrians of Spain
Equestrians at the 1924 Summer Olympics
Sportspeople from Madrid